Air Arabia ( al-ʿArabiyya Lit-Ṭayarān) is an Emirati low-cost airline with its head office in the A1 Building Sharjah Freight Center, Sharjah International Airport, UAE. The airline operates scheduled services to 170 destinations in the Middle East, North Africa, the Indian subcontinent, Central Asia and Europe to 22 countries from Sharjah, 28 destinations in 9 countries from Casablanca, Fez, Nador and Tangier, 11 destinations in 8 countries from Ras Al Khaimah, and 6 destinations in 4 countries from Alexandria. Air Arabia's main base is Sharjah International Airport. There are also hubs in Ras Al Khaimah and Abu Dhabi and focus cities in Alexandria and Casablanca.

History

Air Arabia (العربية للطيران) was established on 3 February 2003 by an Amiri decree issued by Sultan bin Muhammad Al-Qasimi, the Ruler of Sharjah and member of the Supreme Council of the United Arab Emirates, becoming the first low-fare airline in the Middle East. The airline started operations on 28 October 2003. The airline broke even during first year of being in business. It launched an initial public offering for 55% of its stock early in 2007.

In March 2014, Airbus delivered its 6000th A320 family aircraft to Air Arabia.

Corporate affairs

Management and ownership
Air Arabia launched in October 2003 and was the first low-cost carrier in the Middle East.  The company reported more than AED 19 billion in Q4 2019. The airline broke even in its first year of operation. Air Arabia consists of a group of airlines and companies offering travel and tourism services across the Middle East and North Africa.

As of the March 2014 Annual General Meeting, the board members consisted of the following members:

During 2019, Air Arabia filed a misdemeanour case against Arif Naqvi, the Pakistani founder and CEO of private equity firm Abraaj Capital following arbitration measures taken by it during 2018. Naqvi was also a Director of Air Arabia until 2018, and the airline was one of Abraaj’s unsecured creditors with a loan of $75 million in default.

Headquarters
The headquarters is in the Sharjah airport Freight Center, on the property of Sharjah International Airport.

Joint ventures
Air Arabia has created joint ventures at four international bases. The following countries have or did have JV airlines based there:

Abu Dhabi
Air Arabia Abu Dhabi (2020–present). 
The airline was launched on July 14, 2020 after the signing of an agreement between Etihad Airways and Air Arabia. Air Arabia Abu Dhabi will support the network of destinations and services provided by Etihad Airways, and in turn will meet the needs of the low-cost and growing travel sector in the region. Its board of directors, which is made up of members nominated by the two companies, is responsible for directing the company's independent strategy and developing its business.

The IATA code of the airline 3L is used for the flight numbers. The planes based in Abu Dhabi are registered with the IATA code G9 of Air Arabia.

Destinations on schedule from Abu Dhabi are Ahmedabad, Alexandria, Bahrain, Baku, Cairo, Calicut, Chattogram, Chennai, Dhaka, Faisalabad, Istanbul, Jaipur, Kathmandu, Khartoum, Kochi, Multan, Mumbai, Muscat, Salalah, Sarajevo, Shoag, Tbilisi, Thiruvananthapuram and Trabzon as of June 2022.

Armenia
Fly Arna (2021–present). In September 2021, Air Arabia announced a joint venture with the Armenian National Interests Fund (ANIF) to launch a new national airline called Fly Arna. Fly Arna will operate as a low-cost passenger airline with Yerevan’s Zvartnots International Airport (EVN) as its base.

Egypt
Air Arabia Egypt (2010–present). On 9 September 2009, Air Arabia announced Air Arabia Egypt as a joint venture with Egyptian travel and tourism company Travco Group to be based in Alexandria, Egypt. The airline received its operating license on 22 May 2010, with commercial flights beginning 1 June 2010. The fleet in Egypt operates scheduled service and charter traffic from Europe to the Red Sea.

Jordan
Air Arabia Jordan (2015–2018). In January 2015 Air Arabia announced the acquisition of a 49% stake in Petra Airlines. The principal shareholder of Petra Airlines, the RUM Group, retain a 51% stake in the airline, which will be rebranded as Air Arabia Jordan in early 2015. The first flights of the new airline took place during the week commencing 18 May 2015, with launch destinations being Kuwait, Sharm El Sheikh, Erbil, and Jeddah. Air Arabia Jordan ended operations in 2018.

Morocco

Air Arabia Maroc (2009–present). Air Arabia, in a joint venture with Moroccan investors established Air Arabia Maroc and set up a secondary base in Morocco's largest city, Casablanca. It began operations in May 2009, allowing Air Arabia to expand into Europe and Africa.

The Maroc fleet serves mainly European destinations.

Nepal
Fly Yeti (2007–2008). In 2007, Air Arabia opened a base in Nepal's capital Kathmandu to serve Asia and the Middle East, after signing a joint venture agreement with Yeti Airlines. It established a low-cost carrier, Fly Yeti that provided service to international destinations. Due to the uncertain political and economic situation prevailing in Nepal and lack of local government support, FlyYeti operations were suspended in 2008.

Pakistan
Fly Jinnah (2021–present). In September 2021, Air Arabia announced a joint venture with Pakistani conglomerate Lakson Group to launch a low cost airline called Fly Jinnah. This will be a budget carrier serving domestic and international routes from Pakistan.

Business trends
The key trends for Air Arabia over recent years are shown below (as at year ending 31 December):

As the pandemic hit airline services, Air Arabia reported a net loss of AED192 million ($56.2 million) in 2020. Also, the turnover for Q4 of 2020 was 53% below Q4 of 2019. The airline’s net profits in Q1 of 2021 fell by 52% to AED 33.844 million. Also, revenue generated in Q1 of 2021 was AED 572.145 after witnessing major drop from AED 901.374 million in Q1 of 2020.

Destinations

As of July 2021, Air Arabia serves up to 120 airports across the Middle East, North Africa, Asia and Europe.

Fleet
The Air Arabia group fleet consists of the following aircraft as of December 2022:

Livery

Air Arabia has a livery with the aircraft body being painted in three different colors red, grey and white. The tail and each aircraft engine bear the company logo of Sharjah in the form of a bird.

Celebrating 15 years of service in October 2018, a new livery was introduced and was applied to the fleet. The updated logo features a large red bird logo coming down from tail to rear fuselage with grey accents behind its wings and billboard style AirArabia title in English on the front of aircraft with small Arabic title placed next to it above the windows, bird logo also adorns the engines while title in applied on red winglets.

Services
Air Arabia is one of few Low-Cost service Airlines do not provide food & water for passengers, both on domestic and international flights. Passengers can buy on-broad food catering products; it comes with a reasonable cost. f></ref>

Air Arabia does not serve alcoholic beverages on its flights.

Incidents and accidents
 During September 2018, Air Arabia Airbus A320 aircraft, registration A6-ANV, operated commercial flight ABY 111 from Sharjah International Airport to Salalah, Oman that was subject to the UAE’s aviation regulator, Air Accident Investigation Sector (AAIS)'s, investigation due to the co-pilot steering the aircraft onto the wrong runway during a rolling takeoff.

See also
Sharjah International Airport
List of airlines of the United Arab Emirates

References

External links

Official website
Official Air Arabia Holidays website

Airlines established in 2003
Airlines of the United Arab Emirates
Arab Air Carriers Organization members
Companies listed on the Dubai Financial Market
Low-cost carriers
Companies based in the Emirate of Sharjah
Transport in the Emirate of Sharjah
Emirati brands
Emirati companies established in 2003